Michael Grace is the name of:

 Michael P. Grace (1842–1920), international businessman
 Mick Grace (1874–1912), Australian rules footballer
 Mike Grace (third baseman) (born 1956), former Major League Baseball third baseman
 Mike Grace (pitcher) (born 1970), former Major League Baseball pitcher
 Michael Grace Jr., core member and songwriter of bands My Favorite and The Secret History